Serhiy Anatoliovych Stepanchuk (born 25 November 1987 in Dnipropetrovsk, Dnipropetrovsk Oblast) is a Ukrainian football midfielder, striker currently playing for Ukrainian Second League club Kremin.

Club history
Serhiy Stepanchuk began his football career in YFC-2 in Dnipropetrovsk. He transferred to FC Kremin Kremenchuk during 2009 winter transfer window.

Career statistics

References

External links
  Profile – Official Kremin site
  FC Kremin Kremenchuk Squad on the PFL website
 

1987 births
Living people
Ukrainian footballers
FC Kremin Kremenchuk players
FC Arsenal-Kyivshchyna Bila Tserkva players
Association football midfielders
Association football forwards
Footballers from Dnipro